The 1964–65 Yorkshire Cup was the fifty-seventh occasion on which the Yorkshire Cup competition had been held.

Wakefield Trinity winning the trophy by beating Leeds by the score of 18-2.
The match was played at Fartown, Fartown Ground, Huddersfield, now in West Yorkshire. The attendance was 13,527 and receipts were £2,707.

This was Wakefield Trinity's fifth Yorkshire Cup final appearance in a period of nine years (which included four as cup winners and one as runner-up).

Background 

This season there were no junior/amateur clubs taking part, no new entrants and no "leavers" and so the total of entries remained the same at sixteen.

This in turn resulted in no byes in the first round.

Competition and results

Round 1 
Involved 8 matches (with no byes) and 16 clubs

Round 2 - Quarter-finals 
Involved 4 matches and 8 clubs

Round 3 – Semi-finals 
Involved 2 matches and 4 clubs

Final

Teams and scorers 

Scoring - Try = three (3) points - Goal = two (2) points - Drop goal = two (2) points

The road to success

Notes and comments 
1 * The attendance is given as 13,754 by the official Huddersfield 1965 Yearbook but given as 13,527 by RUGBYLEAGUEproject  and by the Rothmans Rugby League Yearbook of 1991-92 and 1990-91

2 * Belle Vue is the home ground of Wakefield Trinity with a capacity of approximately 12,500. The record attendance was 37,906 on the 21 March 1936 in the Challenge Cup semi-final between Leeds and Huddersfield

General information for those unfamiliar 
The Rugby League Yorkshire Cup competition was a knock-out competition between (mainly professional) rugby league clubs from the county of Yorkshire. The actual area was at times increased to encompass other teams from outside the county such as Newcastle, Mansfield, Coventry, and even London (in the form of Acton & Willesden.

The Rugby League season always (until the onset of "Summer Rugby" in 1996) ran from around August-time through to around May-time and this competition always took place early in the season, in the Autumn, with the final taking place in (or just before) December (The only exception to this was when disruption of the fixture list was caused during, and immediately after, the two World Wars)

See also 
1964–65 Northern Rugby Football League season
Rugby league county cups

References

External links
Saints Heritage Society
1896–97 Northern Rugby Football Union season at wigan.rlfans.com
Hull&Proud Fixtures & Results 1896/1897
Widnes Vikings - One team, one passion Season In Review - 1896-97

1964 in English rugby league
RFL Yorkshire Cup